This is a list of notable Turkish sportspeople.



A
 Elvan Abeylegesse – Female middle and long distance track runner
 Mustafa Abi – former Basketball player
 Tutku Açık – Basketball player
 Olcan Adın – Footballer
 Nasuh Akar – Wrestler
 Taha Akgül - Wrestler
 Gülşah Akkaya – Female basketball player
 Derya Aktop – Female boxer 
 Cenk Akyol – Basketball player
 Işıl Alben – female Basketball player
 Furkan Aldemir – Basketball player
 Halil Altıntop – Footballer
 Hamit Altıntop – Footballer
 Eşref Apak – Hammer thrower
 Lütfi Arıboğan – former Basketball player
 Cihat Arman – Footballer
 Ender Arslan – Basketball player
 Can Artam - Race car driver
 Sedat Artuç – Weightlifter
 Ömer Aşık – Basketball player (Houston Rockets)
 Can Akın – Basketball player
 Cenk Akyol – Basketball player
 Serdar Apaydın – former Basketball player, Coach
 Ergin Ataman – Coach
 Necati Ateş – Footballer
 Celal Atik – Wrestler
 Engin Atsür – Basketball player
 İsmet Atlı – Wrestler
 Abdullah Avcı – former Footballer, Coach
 Nazmi Avluca – Wrestler
 Samet Aybaba – former Footballer, Coach
 Efe Aydan – former Basketball player
 Naz Aydemir – Volleyball player
 Fırat Aydınus – Referee
 Soner Aydoğdu – Footballer
 Süreyya Ayhan – Track Athlete
 Serkan Aykut – Footballer
 Mert Aytuğ - Motorcycle racer
 Kazım Ayvaz – Wrestler
 Serdar Aziz – Footballer

B 
 Mesut Bakkal – Coach
 Doğuş Balbay – Basketball player
 Serkan Balcı – Footballer
 Pini Balili – Footballer (striker)
 Hakan Balta – Footballer
 Can Bartu – Footballer
 Birkan Batuk – Basketball player
 Rasim Başak – former Basketball player
 Yıldıray Baştürk – Footballer
 Mithat Bayrak – Wrestler
 Engin Baytar – Footballer
 Cody Bellinger - Baseball Player 
 Malik Beyleroğlu – Boxer
 Erdal Bibo – former Basketball player
 Burak Değer Biçer - Brazilian Jiu-Jitsu practitioner
 Ahmet Bilek – Wrestler
 Gazanfer Bilge – Wrestler
 Aytaç Biter - Race car driver
 Emre Belözoğlu – Footballer
 Sinan Bolat – Footballer
 Bülent Korkmaz - Footballer
 Umut Bulut – Footballer
 Okan Buruk – former Footballer
 Evren Büker – Basketball player
 Çağla Büyükakçay - Female tennis player

C 
 Emre Can – Footballer
 Özhan Canaydın – former basketball player
 Cavit Cav (1905-1982) – Olympian road cyclist

Ç 
 Bahar Çağlar – female Basketball player
 Cüneyt Çakır – Referee
 Rıza Çalımbay – former Footballer, Coach
 Hakan Çalhanoğlu - Footballer
 Nurcan Çarkçı – female Boxer
 Fuat Çapa – Coach
 Serhat Çetin – Basketball player
 Servet Çetin – Footballer
 Burcu Çetinkaya - Female rally driver
 Ahmet Çakar – former Referee
 Emre Çolak – Footballer
 Tanju Çolak – Footballer

D 
 Mustafa Dağıstanlı – Wrestler
 Nedim Dal – former Basketball player
 Yasemin Begüm Dalgalar – female Basketball player
 Yasemin Dalkılıç – Free diver
 Ümit Davala – Footballer
 Gülşen Degener – Female billiards player
 Aykut Demir – Footballer
 Neslihan Demir – Volleyball player
 Mithat Demirel – Basketballer
 Volkan Demirel – Footballer
 Mustafa Denizli – Footballer and coach
 Hakan Dinç - Racing driver
 Kemal Dinçer – former Basketball player, Team manager
 Sinem Doğu – Female ice hockey player
 Yaşar Doğu – Wrestler
 Erwin Dudley – Basketball player

E 
 Şafak Edge – basketball player
 Mehmet Ekici – footballer
Omer Elmas (born 1968 or 1969), wrestler
 Zaza Enden – basketball player
 Orhun Ene – basketball player, coach
 Korel Engin – basketball player
 Ahmet Enünlü – bodybuilder
 Arif Erdem – footballer
 Eda Erdem – volleyball player
 Semih Erden – basketball player
 Harun Erdenay – basketball player, Team manager
 Mevlüt Erdinç – footballer
 Isyan Erdoğan – footballer
 Serkan Erdoğan – basketball player
 Yaşar Erkan – wrestler
 Hasibe Erkoç – Female boxer
 Barış Ermiş – basketball player
 Tufan Ersöz – basketball player
 Erden Eruç – ocean rower, mountain climber, bicyclist

F 
 Malik Fathi – Footballer
 Kerim Frei – Footballer

G 
 Hasan Gemici – Wrestler
 Aytek Genç – former Socceroo and Football(soccer)Coach
 Gizem Girişmen - Paralympic archer
 Hüseyin Göçek – Referee
 Cenk Gönen – Footballer
 Kerem Gönlüm – Basketball player
 Gökhan Gönül – Footballer
Ali Ferit Gören (1913-1987), Austrian-Turkish Olympic sprinter
 Cevat Güler – former Footballer, Coach
 Muratcan Güler – Basketball player
 Sinan Güler – Basketball player
 Ersan Gülüm – Footballer
 Esra Gümüş – Volleyball player
 Gülşah Gümüşay – female Basketball player
 Damla Günay – Athlete (archery)
 İlkay Gündoğan – Footballer
 Şenol Güneş – former Football Player, Coach
 Eren Güngör – Footballer
 Mert Günok – Footballer
 Gizem Güreşen – Volleyball player

H 
 Orhan Hacıyeva – Basketball player
 Tunç Hamarat – Chess placer
 Hamza Hamzaoğlu – former Footballer, Coach
 Tayfur Havutçu – former Footballer, Coach
 Quanitra Hollingsworth – female Basketball player
 Yasemin Horasan – female Basketball player

I 
 Daniyar Ismayilov - Weightlifter
 Kemal Izzet – Footballer
 Muzzy Izzet – Footballer

İ 
 Tunç İlkin, former Pittsburgh Steelers player and Sports Commentator
 Ersan İlyasova – Basketball player (Milwaukee Bucks)
 Marsel İlhan – Tennis player
 Selçuk İnan – Footballer
 Şaziye İvegin – female Basketball player

K 
 Giray Kaçar – Footballer
 Tolunay Kafkas – former Footballer, Coach
 Nihat Kahveci – Footballer
 Enes Kanter - Basketball player (Utah Jazz)
 Hamit Kaplan – Wrestler
 Jem Karacan – Footballer
 Azar Karadas – Footballer
 Tuğba Karademir – Female figure skater
 Ali Karadeniz – Basketball player
 Hikmet Karaman – Coach
 İlkan Karaman – Basketball player
 Orçun Karaoğlanoğlu – Kayaker 
 Özge Kavurmacıoğlu – former Basketball player
 Semih Kaya – Footballer
 Suat Kaya – Footballer
 Sümeyra Kaya – Female boxer
 Rıza Kayaalp - Wrestler
 Tugay Kerimoğlu - Footballer
 Zekiye Keskin Satır – Athlete (Archery)
 Tevfik Kış – Wrestler
 Onur Kıvrak – Footballer
 Erkut Kızılırmak - Race car driver
 Şebnem Kimyacıoğlu – female Basketball player
 Ahmet Kireççi – Wrestler
 Aykut Kocaman – former Footballer, Coach
 Bülent Korkmaz – former Footballer, Coach
 Egemen Korkmaz – Footballer
 Göksenin Köksal – Basketball player
 İsmail Köybaşı – Footballer
 Erman Kunter – Coach
 İbrahim Kutluay – former Basketball player
 Ermal Kuqo – Basketball player
 Lefter Küçükandonyadis – Footballer

M 
 Oktay Mahmuti – Coach
 Hami Mandıralı – former Footballer
 İlhan Mansız – Footballer
 Damir Mršić – former Basketball player, Team manager
 Halil Mutlu – Weightlifter

N 
 Cemal Nalga – Basketball player
 Petar Naumoski – former Basketball player
 Kristen Newlin – female Basketball player

O 
 İsmail Ogan – Wrestler
 Mehmet Oktav – Wrestler
 Metin Oktay – Footballer
 Mehmet Okur – former NBA player and 2007 NBA All-Star
 Ibrahim Okyay - Race car driver
 Ömer Onan – Basketball player
 Leon Osman – Footballer
 Levent Osman – Football (soccer) player
 Tamer Oyguç – former Basketball player

Ö 
 Kaan Önder - Race car driver
 Aydın Örs – Coach
 Alpay Özalan – Footballer
 Tolgay Özbey – Footballer
 Mehmet Özdilek – former Footballer, Coach
 Cevher Özer – Basketball player
 Mesut Özil – Footballer
 Halis Özkahya – Referee
 Neriman Özsoy – Volleyball player
 Hüseyin Özkan – Judoka
 Oğuzhan Özyakup – Footballer

P 
 Zaza Pachulia – Basketball player
 Tuğba Palazoğlu – female Basketball player
 Asım Pars – former Basketball player
 Kaya Peker – Basketball player
 Mustafa Pektemek – Footballer
 Ergün Penbe – former Footballer
 Alper Potuk – Footballer
 Emir Preldžić – Basketball player

R 
 Rüştü Reçber – Footballer
 Colin Kazim-Richards, footballer
 Omer Riza, footballer

S 
 Ertuğrul Sağlam – former Footballer, Coach
 Nurullah Sağlam – Coach
 Taner Sağır – Weightlifter 
 Sinan Şamil Sam – Boxer
 Sercan Sararer – Footballer
 Veysel Sarı – Footballer
 Ufuk Sarıca – former Basketball player, Coach
 Oğuz Savaş – Basketball player
 Semih Saygıner – Billiards player
 Yasemin Saylar– female Basketball player
 Mehmet Scholl – footballer
 Müzahir Sille – Wrestler
 Kenan Sipahi – Basketball player
 Sedat Sir – Australian Rules Football player
 Bahattin Sofuoğlu – Motorcycle racer
 Kenan Sofuoğlu – Motorcycle racer
 Sinan Sofuoğlu – Motorcycle racer
 Fatih Solak – former Basketball player
 Ümit Sonkol – Basketball player
 Gözde Sonsırma – Volleyball player
 İpek Soylu - Female tennis player
 Ercüment Sunter – Coach
 Naim Süleymanoğlu – Weightlifter

Ş 
 Olcay Şahan – Footballer
 Hülya Şahin (Julia Şahin) – Female Boxer, Women's International Boxing Federation (WIBF) jr flyweight champion
 Nuri Şahin – Footballer
 Tuncay – Footballer 
 Hasan Şaş – former Footballer, Coach
 Volkan Şen – Footballer
 Hülya Şenyurt – Female judoka
 Mert Shumpert – Basketball player
 Bayram Şit – Wrestler
 Hakan Şükür – former Footballer

T 
 Jason Tahincioğlu – Auto racing driver
 Mümtaz Tahincioğlu - Auto racing driver
 Ufuk Talay - Football (soccer) player
 Cüneyt Tanman - Footballer
 Bahri Tanrıkulu – Taekwondo athlete
 Serdar Tasci – Footballer
 Ertuğrul Taşkıran – Footballer
 Nur Tatar - Taekwondo athlete
 Ramazan Tavşancıoğlu, football (soccer) player
 Nurcan Taylan – Weightlifter
 Servet Tazegül - Taekwondo athlete
 Fatih Tekke – Footballer 
 Fatih Terim – Footballer and coach
 Merve Terzioğlu – Female swimmer
 Hamide Bıkçın Tosun – Female taekwondo athlete
 Bahar Toksoy – Volleyball player
 Mehmet Topal – Footballer
 Ömer Toprak – Footballer
 Levent Topsakal – former Basketball player, Team manager
 İbrahim Toraman – Footballer
 Gökhan Töre – Footballer
 Caner Topaloğlu – Basketball player
 Tunay Torun – Footballer
 Gülnur Tumbat (born 1975) - Mountaineer and ultramarathon runner
 Talat Tunçalp (born c. 1917), Olympian cyclist
 Kerem Tunçeri – Basketball player
 Esmeral Tunçluer – female Basketball player
 Arda Turan – Footballer
 Cemil Turan – Footballer
 Mirsad Türkcan – former Basketball player
 Hidayet Türkoğlu – NBA Basketball player
 İzzet Türkyılmaz – Basketball player
 Uğur Tütüneker – former Footballer, Coach

U 
 Oktay Urkal – Boxer
 Binnaz Uslu – Female middle distance track runner
 Polen Uslupehlivan – Volleyball player
 Yasemin Ustalar – Female boxer
 Bülent Uygun – former Footballer, Coach

Ü 
 Hakan Ünsal – former Footballer
 İbrahim Üzülmez former Footballer

V 

 Birsel Vardarlı – female Basketball player
 Yılmaz Vural – Coach

W 
 Fatima Whitbread – javelin thrower

Y 
 Selma Yağcı – Female boxer
 Mehmet Yağmur – Basketball player
 Lev Yalcin – Footballer
 Sergen Yalçın – former Footballer
 Atagün Yalçınkaya - Boxer
 Ersun Yanal – Coach
 Şemsi Yaralı – Female boxer
 Bekir Yarangüme – former Basketball player
 Hamza Yerlikaya – Wrestler
 Bülent Yıldırım – Referee
 Haluk Yıldırım – former Basketball player
 Burak Yılmaz – Footballer
 Sefa Yılmaz – Footballer
 Selçuk Yula – Footballer
 Mustafa Yumlu – Footballer
 Nedim Yücel – Basketball player
 Müjde Yüksel – female Basketball player

Z 
 Gökhan Zan – Footballer
 Tolga Zengin – Footballer

See also
Sports in Turkey

References 

 
 
Sportspeople
Turkish sportspeople